"Magnolia" is a hip hop song by American rapper Playboi Carti. It was released on April 14, 2017, as the third single from his eponymous debut commercial mixtape Playboi Carti (2017). The song was produced by Pi'erre Bourne. The title is referring to the Magnolia Projects in New Orleans. The beginning is a sample from The Jamie Foxx Show, which is used as a producer tag for Pi'erre.

Music video
A music video was released for the song on July 8, 2017 of 106 & Park. It was directed by Hidji Films and features cameo appearances from song's producer Pi'erre Bourne, ASAP Rocky and the ASAP Mob, m14thew, harve (also known as xxwv), Slim Jxmmi, x.mofe, Southside, A Boogie wit da Hoodie, Don Q, Nav, Casanova, Smooky Margielaa, Juelz Santana and Cash, one of the XO members. The music video was filmed in New York City. The video has over 177 million views as of January 2023.

Remixes
Multiple rappers have released freestyles and remixes of this song due to the popularity, most notably Lil Wayne, who released a freestyle on July 5, 2017, on his In Tune We Trust EP.

Canadian rapper Tory Lanez remixed the song and was slammed by producer Pi'erre Bourne for using the instrumental without permission.

Charts

Weekly charts

Year-end charts

Certifications

Release history

References 

2017 singles
2017 songs
Trap music songs
Southern hip hop songs
Interscope Records singles
Songs written by Pi'erre Bourne
Songs written by Playboi Carti
Songs about crime
Playboi Carti songs
Songs about cocaine